Ogdensburg may refer to:

 Ogdensburg, Michigan (ghost town), U.S.
 Ogdensburg, New Jersey, U.S.
 Ogdensburg, New York, U.S.
 Battle of Ogdensburg, 1813
 Ogdensburg, Wisconsin, U.S.
 Ogdensburg-Prescott International Bridge, connects Ogdensburg, New York to Prescott in Canada
 Ogdensburg Agreement, established military cooperation between the USA and Canada in 1940